Aiza Evfratkyzy Imambek or Mambekova (Aiza Evfratqyzy İmambek; born 25 February 1999) is a Kazakh figure skater. She is the 2019 Reykjavik International silver medalist, the 2018 FBMA Trophy bronze medalist, and a five-time Kazakhstani national silver medalist (2014–2018). She represented Kazakhstan at the 2018 Winter Olympics, placing 30th.

Career

Early years 
Imambek began learning to skate in 2003. Her first coach was Aigul Kuanysheva. She made her junior international debut in August 2012, at the Asian Figure Skating Trophy in Taipei, Taiwan.

During the 2014–2015 season, Imambek was coached by Galina Masliuk. Her first ISU Junior Grand Prix assignment took place in September 2014 in the Czech Republic. Her senior international debut came in December, at Estonia's Tallinn Trophy.

By the 2015–2016 season, Imambek was training under Kuralai Uzurova in Astana and Akbulak, Kazakhstan.

2016–2017 season 
Imambek qualified to the final segment at the 2017 Winter Universiade, held in February in Almaty, Kazakhstan; she ranked 16th in the short program, 10th in the free skate, and 13th overall. Later that month, she placed 8th at the 2017 Asian Winter Games in Sapporo, Japan.

In March, Imambek placed 31st in the short program at the 2017 World Junior Championships in Taipei, Taiwan. Due to Elizabet Tursynbayeva's result at the 2017 World Championships, Kazakhstan obtained two Olympic spots in ladies' figure skating.
During the season, Imambek achieved the International Skating Union's minimum technical scores, making her eligible for one of the spots.

2017–2018 season 
Imambek decided to train with Uzurova in Almaty and with Alexei Mishin in Saint Petersburg, Russia. She missed the first part of the season due to a fracture in her foot. In December 2017, she was nominated to represent Kazakhstan at the Olympics.

In January, Imambek won the bronze medal at the FBMA Trophy in Abu Dhabi, United Arab Emirates, and placed 20th at the 2018 Four Continents Championships in Taipei, Taiwan. In February, she will compete at the 2018 Winter Olympics in Pyeongchang, South Korea.

Programs

Competitive highlights 
CS: Challenger Series; JGP: Junior Grand Prix

References

External links 
 
 Aiza Imambek at Instagram

1999 births
Kazakhstani female single skaters
Living people
Sportspeople from Almaty
Figure skaters at the 2017 Asian Winter Games
Figure skaters at the 2018 Winter Olympics
Olympic figure skaters of Kazakhstan
Competitors at the 2017 Winter Universiade
Competitors at the 2019 Winter Universiade